Cross Road is a major arterial road that travels east–west through the inner southern suburbs of the Australian city of Adelaide. It is designated route A3.

Route
Cross Road starts at the intersection at Anzac Highway in Plympton and heads directly east, crossing the Glenelg tram line shortly after, then crossing the Flinders railway line and Seaford railway line at Emerson Crossing under the South Road underpass, and the Belair and Adelaide-Wolseley railway lines in Unley Park. It continues east through Highgate and eventually ends at Glen Osmond and the Adelaide Hills, at the junction of Glen Osmond Road, Portrush Road, and South Eastern Freeway.

History
In a 1949 street directory, Cross Road had its current route, but was named "Cross Roads" (plural) and is shown as the aggregation of a number of local street names including:
High Terrace (between Fullarton and Unley Roads)
Napier Terrace (Between Unley and Goodwood Roads)
South Terrace (between Goodwood and South Roads)
Glen Osmond Road (between South and Marion Roads)
Plympton Terrace (between Marion Road and Anzac Highway)

Major intersections

References

Roads in Adelaide